Arlington Mountain, a 1857 ft. peak, in the northern Temescal Mountains.   It is located northwest of nearby Lake Mathews, overlooking western Riverside, in Riverside County, California.

References 

Mountains of Riverside County, California
Temescal Mountains
Mountains of Southern California